Long intergenic non-protein coding RNA 598 is a protein that in humans is encoded by the LINC00598 gene.

References

Further reading 

Proteins